Nongmaithem Ratanbala Devi (born 2 December 1999) is an Indian women's professional footballer from Manipur. She plays for Gokulam Kerala and India women's national football team. She played her debut international match in AFC Cup Qualifiers 2018.

Career 
Ratanbala called up for national team during 2018 AFC Women's Asian Cup Qualifiers and there she scored her first goal against Hong Kong on 11 April 2017. Then she became regular member of India women's national football team. Her second goal was against Myanmar in 2020 AFC Women's Olympic Qualifiers Round 1 on 13 November 2018. Then in friendly against Hong Kong on 21 January 2019 scored another one and in another friendly against Indonesia on 27 January 2019 she scored her first hattrick for national team. Then in 2019 Gold Cup she scored another goal against Nepal on 11 February 2019. In 2019 SAFF Women's Championship he scored 2 goals, 1 against Maldives on 13 March and another against Sri Lanka on 17 March. In 2020 AFC Women's Olympic Qualifiers Round 2 she scored 1 goal in " 3-3 " thriller action match against Myanmar on 9 April 2019. Unfortunately India didn't qualify for 2020 AFC Women's Olympic Qualifiers Round 3 by goal difference.

Career statistics

International goals

Honours

India
 SAFF Women's Championship: 2019
 South Asian Games Gold medal: 2019

Sethu FC
Indian Women's League: 2018–19

Gokulam Kerala
Indian Women's League: 2021–22

KRYPHSA
Indian Women's League runner-up: 2019–20

Manipur
 National Games Gold medal: 2022

Individual
 Indian Women's League Most Valuable Player: 2019–20
 Indian Women's League Emerging Player: 2018–19

References

External links 
 Nongmaithem Ratanbala Devi at All India Football Federation
 

Living people
Indian women's footballers
Women's association football forwards
Footballers from Manipur
India women's international footballers
India women's youth international footballers
Sportswomen from Manipur
21st-century Indian women
21st-century Indian people
Kryphsa F.C. Players
Sethu FC players
Gokulam Kerala FC Women players
1994 births
Indian Women's League players
South Asian Games gold medalists for India
South Asian Games medalists in football